Dippen may refer to the following places in Scotland:

 Dippen, Argyll, a village on the Kintyre Peninsula
 Dippen Bay, a coastal water feature on the east of the Kintyre Peninsula
 Dippen, Arran, a village on the Isle of Arran, North Ayrshire